Maduro & Curiel's Bank (MCB) is a private Dutch Caribbean bank and financial services provider headquartered in Willemstad, Curaçao that operates 23 branches and specializes in insurance brokerage, consumer banking, trust, private banking and corporate management services.

History 

Beginning in 1893, the absence of coins and banknotes in Curaçao led S.E.L. Maduro & Sons to issue money coupons up until the introduction of the 1901 Coinage Act. For a long time this 'Maduro Money' was accepted as payment on the ABC islands. However, by the early 20th century increasing industrialization following the discovery of oil in nearby Venezuela and the opening of the Panama Canal ushered in a demand for modern banking services.

On December 16, 1916, after a failed bid to take over the Central Bank of Curaçao, local financier Joseph Alvarez-Correa with the financial backing of S.E.L. Maduro & Sons established Maduro's Bank, the island's first commercial bank. In 1932, Curiel's Bank, founded by members of the Curiel family and which had grown from the successful banking department of Morris E. Curiel & Sons, merged with Maduro's Bank to form MCB.

The bank became notable for being the first to extend credit to Eastern European Jews fleeing persecution in the years preceding World War II.

Since 1970, MCB has been affiliated with Scotiabank.

Maduro & Curiel's Group 

 Maduro & Curiel's Bank N.V.
 Caribbean Mercantile Bank N.V.
 Maduro & Curiel's Bank (Bonaire) N.V.
 The Windward Islands Bank Ltd.
 MCB Risk Insurance N.V.
 Maduro & Curiel's Insurance Services N.V.
 Progress N.V.
 MCB Securities Administration N.V.
 Caribbean Factoring Services B.V.
 FactorPlus Aruba N.V.
 FactorPlus Sint Maarten N.V.

References

External links

Maduro & Curiel's Bank 

Banks of Curaçao
1917 establishments in Curaçao and Dependencies
Banks established in 1917